The Westland Walrus was a British spotter/reconnaissance aircraft built by Westland Aircraft.

Design and development
In 1919 the Royal Navy had an urgent need for a three-seat spotter/reconnaissance aircraft. To save money, the Airco DH.9A was adapted from part completed airframes, available in large numbers following the end of the First World War and the cancellation of orders. The initial attempt was carried out by Armstrong Whitworth Aircraft, adding provision for an observer and removing the stagger from the wings to produce the Armstrong Whitworth Tadpole.

Further development was passed on to Westland, who further modified the aircraft to produce the Walrus, with a 450 hp (336 kW) Napier Lion II engine replacing the Liberty engine of the DH.9A and Tadpole. Like the DH.9A, the Walrus was a single-engined, two-bay biplane. It was fitted with an extra cockpit for the observer/radio operator behind the gunner's cockpit, while the observer also had a prone position for observing in a ventral pannier. The undercarriage could be jettisoned and the aircraft was fitted with floatation bags and hydrovanes to aid safe ditching, together with arresting gear to aid landing on aircraft carriers. The wings were detachable to aid storage. The prototype first flew in early 1921, proving to have poor flying characteristics, being described by Westland's test pilot Stuart Keep as "a vicious beast" but despite this, a further 35 were ordered.

Operational history
Production aircraft began to be delivered to No. 3 Squadron RAF at RAF Leuchars in 1921. No. 3 Squadron was split up to form independent Fleet Spotter Flights in 1923, although despite the extensive navalisation, the Walrus never operated from carriers.  The Walrus continued in service in the Fleet spotting role until replaced by the Avro Bison and Blackburn Blackburn in late 1925.

Operators

 Royal Air Force
 No. 3 Squadron RAF (Fleet Air Arm from 1924)

Specifications

See also

References

 
 
 

1920s British military reconnaissance aircraft
Walrus
Biplanes
Carrier-based aircraft
Single-engined tractor aircraft
Aircraft first flown in 1921